Mohammad Jahan Nuristani (born 1926) was an Afghan field hockey player, who competed at the 1948 Summer Olympic Games and played in one match against Great Britain.

References

External links
 

1926 births
Possibly living people
Afghan male field hockey players
Olympic field hockey players of Afghanistan
Field hockey players at the 1948 Summer Olympics